Meringosphaera is a genus of algae belonging to the family Pleurochloridaceae.

The species of this genus are reported to have worldwide distribution  including in Eurasia, Africa and Northern America.

Species:

Meringosphaera aculeata 
Meringosphaera mediterranea 
Meringosphaera spinosa 
Meringosphaera tenerrima

References

Xanthophyceae
Heterokont genera